Dream Nails is an English DIY punk/riot grrrl band from London founded in 2015. The group identify themselves as “punk witches” and are known for their riotous live shows that mix storming punk guitar with sweet three-part harmonies.

Biography 
Dream Nails was founded in London in August 2015 by Janey Starling, singer, and Anya Pearson, guitarist. The two friends met through their involvement with feminist activism and brought fellow activist Emmett Roberts on board to play bass and Judith Dawson on drums. In early 2016, Lucy Katz replaced Judith on drums. Within one year of performing together they were invited to perform at Glastonbury's Sisterhood stage – the first women-only venue at the festival.

In 2017, Katherine Christie Evans briefly replaced Roberts on bass and backing vocals, replaced in turn by Mimi Jasson.

On  30 April 2021, co-founder and frontwoman Janey Starling announced her departure from the band.

Dream Nails identify themselves as punk witches and their genre as "witch punk". They claim to write "hexes, not songs" and are best known for their "hex on misogynist politicians" Deep Heat. The group's first single was released with a video premiered on Nylon, in time for the 2016 election of the United States of American's president, Donald Trump.

Their first EP, DIY was released in April 2016 with a handmade zine and enjoyed immediate attention from Dazed and Confused. After embarking on short tours in Belgium, the Netherlands and Austria, Dream Nails were invited to be the main support for American band Cherry Glazerr on their European tour in spring 2017. A second EP Dare to Care followed in 2017. A live album Take Up Space - a recording of an acoustic performance at Housmans Bookshop - was released in early 2019.

The band promote a DIY ethic, with handmade pedalboards, cut and paste zines and the self-made video for their song "DIY" composed of self-submitted mobile phone videos from fans edited together by vocalist Janey.

In August 2020 the band released their self-titled first album on Alcopop! Records.

Discography

Singles 
 Deep Heat, DL, Self release (2016) and Krod Records (2017)
 Tourist, DL, Krod Records (2017)
 Vagina Police / Fascism Is Coming, 7"/DL, Everything Sucks Music (2018)
 Corporate Realness, 7"/DL, Alcopop! Records (UK) / Firebrand Records (US) (2019)
 Text Me Back (Chirpse Degree Burns), DL, Alcopop! Records (2020)

Extended plays 
 DIY EP, CD/DL, Self release (2016)
 Dare to Care EP, CD/DL, Krod Records (2017)

Albums 
 Dream Nails, LP, CD, DL, Alcopop! Records (2020)

Live albums
 Take Up Space, DL (2019)

Compilation appearances 
 Loud Women: Volume One, CD, 2017
 Femrock Mixtape, 2017
 Girls go BOOM Mixtape #1, 2017

References 

Underground punk scene in the United Kingdom
English punk rock groups
Riot grrrl bands
Feminist musicians